The Golden Globe Award for Best Actress in a Motion Picture – Comedy or Musical is a Golden Globe Award that was first awarded by the Hollywood Foreign Press Association as a separate category in 1951. Previously, there was a single award for "Best Actress in a Motion Picture", but the splitting allowed for recognition of it and the Best Actress – Drama.

The formal title has varied since its inception. In 2005, it was officially called "Best Performance by an Actress in a Motion Picture – Comedy or Musical". , the wording is "Best Actress in a Motion Picture – Comedy or Musical".

Winners and nominees

1950s

1960s

1970s

1980s

1990s

2000s

2010s

2020s

Multiple nominees

10 nominations
 Meryl Streep

9 nominations
 Shirley MacLaine

8 nominations
 Julie Andrews

7 nominations
 Goldie Hawn
 Barbra Streisand

5 nominations
 Annette Bening
 Audrey Hepburn
 Bette Midler
 Renée Zellweger

4 nominations
 Doris Day
 Mia Farrow
 Diane Keaton
 Liza Minnelli
 Julia Roberts
 Maggie Smith
 Emma Stone
 Emma Thompson
 Kathleen Turner

3 nominations
 Amy Adams
 Lucille Ball
 Anne Bancroft
 Emily Blunt
 Sandra Bullock
 Carol Burnett
 Marion Cotillard
 Jamie Lee Curtis
 Judi Dench
 Sally Field
 Jane Fonda
 Barbara Harris
 Jennifer Lawrence
 Helen Mirren
 Julianne Moore
 Michelle Pfeiffer
 Vanessa Redgrave
 Debbie Reynolds
 Rosalind Russell
 Meg Ryan
 Lily Tomlin
 Reese Witherspoon

2 nominations

 Ann-Margret
 Ingrid Bergman
 Cate Blanchett
 Jill Clayburgh
 Glenn Close
 Toni Collette
 Geena Davis
 Jodie Foster
 Melanie Griffith
 Judy Holliday
 Anjelica Huston
 Nicole Kidman
 Angela Lansbury
 Cloris Leachman
 Sophia Loren
 Andie MacDowell
 Marsha Mason
 Frances McDormand
 Hayley Mills
 Marilyn Monroe
 Dolly Parton
 Margot Robbie
 Jean Simmons
 Sissy Spacek
 Anya Taylor-Joy
 Charlize Theron
 Kate Winslet
 Natalie Wood

Multiple wins

3 awards
 Julie Andrews (2 consecutive)
 Rosalind Russell (2 consecutive)

2 awards
 Amy Adams (consecutive)
 Annette Bening
 Diane Keaton
 Nicole Kidman
 Jennifer Lawrence
 Shirley MacLaine
 Bette Midler
 Sissy Spacek
 Meryl Streep
 Barbra Streisand
 Kathleen Turner (consecutive)
 Renée Zellweger

Firsts
Angela Bassett became the first actress of African descent to win when she won in 1993.
Marion Cotillard became the first actress to win for a foreign-language/non-english language performance when she won in 2007.
Awkwafina became the actress of Asian descent to win when she won in 2020.
Rachel Zegler became the first actress of Colombian descent and first Latina to win when she won in 2022. She also became the youngest winner in this category at 20 years old.
Michelle Yeoh became the first Malaysian actress to win when she won in 2023.

See also
 Academy Award for Best Actress
 Critics' Choice Movie Award for Best Actress
 Independent Spirit Award for Best Female Lead
 BAFTA Award for Best Actress in a Leading Role
 Golden Globe Award for Best Actress in a Motion Picture – Drama
 Screen Actors Guild Award for Outstanding Performance by a Female Actor in a Leading Role

References

External links
 Golden Globe Award Nominations. goldenglobes.org
 Golden Globe Award Search. goldenglobes.org

Golden Globe Awards
 
Film awards for lead actress